Lee Alexander Molyneaux (born 16 January 1983) is an English footballer who plays as a defender for Locks Heath. He is the former manager of Gosport Borough.

His former clubs include Portsmouth, Derry City of the League of Ireland, Weymouth, Selsey, Oxford United, Basingstoke Town, Cirencester Town and Forest Green Rovers.

Career
Molyneaux came through the ranks at  Portsmouth, 2 years in the Academy and 1 year as a professional Lee, along with many other players was released the year that Portsmouth were promoted to the Premier League. He joined Derry City in Northern Ireland before returning to the UK, joining Weymouth during Christmas 2003, making his debut on 1 January 2004 in a local derby against Dorchester Town. After appearing for Selsey during second half of the season, Oxford United manager Graham Rix signed him on a 1-year contract for the 2004–05 season after impressing in pre-season matches and training. It ended in November 2005 when a new manager came in. He then moved to Basingstoke Town, and from there Cirencester Town in 2006.

In July 2008, he joined Forest Green Rovers in the Conference National. He had previously featured for the club's reserve team squad while studying for a degree at Hartpury College. He was released by Forest Green in December 2008.

He then signed for Clevedon Town in January 2009. He then moved to Gloucester City before leaving in 2010.

In the summer of 2011, Molyneaux joined Gosport Borough, at the time in the Southern League Division One South & West winning back to back promotions and leading them out at Wembley in the FA Trophy Cup Final.

Molyneaux moved to Havant & Waterlooville for the 2015–16 season, making eighteen league appearances as the club were relegated from the National League South. In November 2017, having helped Havant earn again back to back promotion getting them to the National League, he rejoined Gosport, now struggling in the Southern League Premier Division, on a month's loan. He made his second début for Gosport in a 1–0 victory over Dunstable Town, their first win of the season.

On 8 June 2021, Molyneaux returned to playing, joining Wessex League side Baffins Milton Rovers.

In October 2022, Molyneaux joined Hampshire Premier League side Locks Heath having started the season with Horndean.

Managerial career
After acting as a player-coach at Havant & Waterlooville for the 2018–19 season, he was appointed the manager of Gosport Borough in May 2019. In June 2020, he stepped down from his role as Gosport manager. He started the following season as assistant manager at AFC Portchester.

References

External links

Non-league stats at Aylesbury United

1983 births
Living people
Footballers from Portsmouth
English footballers
Association football defenders
Portsmouth F.C. players
Derry City F.C. players
Weymouth F.C. players
Selsey F.C. players
Oxford United F.C. players
Basingstoke Town F.C. players
Cirencester Town F.C. players
Forest Green Rovers F.C. players
Clevedon Town F.C. players
Gloucester City A.F.C. players
Gosport Borough F.C. players
Havant & Waterlooville F.C. players
A.F.C. Portchester players
Baffins Milton Rovers F.C. players
Horndean F.C. players
Locks Heath F.C. players
English Football League players
Expatriate association footballers in the Republic of Ireland
Wessex Football League players